"I'll Never Fall in Love Again" is a song written by Lonnie Donegan and Jimmy Currie, and first released by Donegan as a single in 1962.

Cover versions

The most commercially successful recording of the song was by Tom Jones in 1967. Upon its first release, Jones' recording reached number 2 in the UK Singles Chart but was less successful in the United States where it peaked at number 49 on the Hot 100, and number 28 on the Adult Contemporary chart.

As the follow-up to Jones' "Love Me Tonight", "I'll Never Fall in Love Again" was reissued in 1969 in the US, reaching number six on the Hot 100 and number one on the Adult Contemporary chart.

This song was covered in 1978 by the Filipino Tom Jones impersonator Sam Sorono (1950–2008) on his Sings Tom Jones' Greatest Hits album with EMI Records.

The song was also covered by Elvis Presley on the From Elvis Presley Boulevard, Memphis, Tennessee album in 1976.

It was also recorded by Richard Marx (B-side to "The Way She Loves Me"), Timi Yuro on her 1968 album Something Bad on My Mind, Lena Martell, Charlie Hodges, and Marco T.

In 2019, Donegan's son, Peter, auditioned for The Voice UK in which Tom Jones turned his chair for him. Jones when finding out and taken aback by who he was, performed an impromptu duet of the song with Peter.

Composition

The verses are melodically based on the traditional "Wanderin", even recycling the "It looks like" phrase. The Italian styled chorus however sounds very different and new.

See also
List of number-one adult contemporary singles of 1969 (U.S.)

References

External links
 

1962 singles
1962 songs
1967 singles
1969 singles
Tom Jones (singer) songs
Elvis Presley songs
Richard Marx songs
Pye Records singles
Decca Records singles
Lonnie Donegan songs